USS Core (CVE-13), a  named for the Core Sound in North Carolina, was originally classified AVG-13, but was reclassified ACV-13, 20 August 1942; CVE-13, 15 July 1943; CVHE-13, 12 June 1955; CVU-13, 1 July 1958; and T-AKV-41, 7 May 1959.  She was launched 15 May 1942 by Seattle-Tacoma Shipbuilding of Tacoma, Washington, under a Maritime Commission contract; sponsored by Mrs. B. B. Smith, wife of Lieutenant Commander Smith; acquired by the Navy, 1 May 1942; and commissioned 10 December 1942, Captain M. R. Greer in command.

Service history
Clearing Puget Sound 6 February 1943, Core qualified pilots in carrier operations off San Diego, then sailed on to the east coast, arriving at Norfolk 11 April. She continued to train pilots in Chesapeake Bay until 27 June when she sortied as the nucleus of TG 21.12, a hunter-killer group. Such groups, providing cover for the movement of convoys, made a contribution of great significance to winning the Battle of the Atlantic, and the innovation represented by their formation was a marked advance in antisubmarine warfare. Planes from Core worked in coordination with accompanying destroyers scoring a number of successful attacks. Core returned to Norfolk 31 July from a most successful first patrol.

She returned to Norfolk 19 November.

Following another hunter-killer patrol from 6 December 1943 to 18 January 1944, Core ferried 56 P-51s and other cargo to Liverpool from 6 February to 9 March. From 3 April to 29 May, she operated with TG 21.16 in the central and North Atlantic, then sailed from New York 24 June to ferry 85 Army aircraft to Glasgow, Scotland, returning to Norfolk 20 July. Returning to antisubmarine operations 8 August as CTG 22.4, Core conducted training exercises against newly revealed enemy submarine tactics off Bermuda until 8 October when she returned to Norfolk for an overhaul. After a period qualifying carrier pilots at Quonset Point, she sailed from Norfolk 24 January 1945 to lead her group against weather reporting submarines operating in the North Atlantic, but fog and rough weather prevented successful attacks. She sailed from Norfolk 3 April to join a large antisubmarine unit at Guantanamo Bay 7 April. Core returned to New York 11 May for repairs and replenishment.

Clearing Norfolk 13 June 1945, Core arrived at San Diego 25 June. She carried aircraft and aviation personnel to Pearl Harbor and to Samar, returning 30 August. Until 20 October, she sailed between Alameda and Seattle on transport duty then sailed for Yokosuka, Japan, on "Magic Carpet" duty, to return homeward-bound servicemen. She made two such voyages from 20 October 1945 to 18 January 1946. Core was placed out of commission in reserve 4 October 1946 at Port Angeles, Washington.

The ship was redesignated as a helicopter escort carrier (CVHE-13) 12 June 1955, a utility carrier (CVU-13) 1 July 1958 and finally an aviation transport (T-AKV-41) 7 May 1959.  On 11 December 1961, the USNS Core docked in the Saigon Port to unload 32 H-21 Shawnee helicopters and more than 400 U.S. soldiers from the 57th Transportation Company (Light Helicopter) from Fort Lewis, and the 8th Transportation Company (Light Helicopter) from Fort Bragg.

Core was stricken for disposal on 15 September 1970 and sold for scrap in 1971.

Awards
Core received one battle star for World War II service.

Sources
 
 JFK Day by Day by Terry Golway and Les Krantz (Running Press 2010)

References 

Bogue-class escort carriers of the United States Navy
Ships built in Tacoma, Washington
1942 ships
World War II escort aircraft carriers of the United States